Jovan Adepo (born September 6, 1988) is a British-American actor. He is known for his role as Cory Maxson in the film adaptation of Fences (2016), and also had starring roles in the 2018 film Overlord and as Lionel Jefferson in CBS' All in the Family/The Jeffersons special. Adepo was featured in the series When They See Us, the second season of Jack Ryan, and the Facebook series Sorry for Your Loss. He plays Michael Murphy in the HBO series The Leftovers and in 2019 appeared in Watchmen as Hooded Justice. For the latter, he was nominated for the Primetime Emmy Award for Outstanding Supporting Actor in a Limited Series or Movie. He also starred as Larry Underwood in the miniseries of Stephen King's The Stand.

Early life and education
Adepo was born in 1988 in Upper Heyford, Oxfordshire. His mother is a British Nigerian from London, while his father is an African American from Chattanooga, Tennessee. His maternal grandfather Fatai Adepo was special adviser to former Nigerian President Olusegun Obasanjo. He moved to the United States with his family at the age of 2. Raised in Waldorf, Maryland, he acted in school and church plays.

He attended college at Bowie State University in Maryland, receiving his B.A. in political science and philosophy. While studying political science, he began taking creative writing classes. He later decided he wanted to move to Los Angeles to become a writer. He started doing commercial workshops to supplement income.

Career

Early workshops and roles 
He moved to Los Angeles in 2011 after receiving his bachelor's degree in political science. His first acting job for the Disney Channel on K.C. Undercover. To make ends meet, he took acting classes in order to book commercials. Here, he grew an interest in becoming an actor. Adepo studied acting under the tutelage of a variety of notable instructors, including Dianne Hull of the Actors Studio. Through church in Maryland he met Viola Davis's older sister, who helped him get in contact with Davis. It was Davis who put Adepo on the path to studying the right techniques, seeing plays, and reading as many plays as he could.

Film and television roles 
He was part of Live in Front of a Studio Audience: Norman Lear's All in the Family and The Jeffersons. He played the role of Lionel Jefferson. The special was conceptualized and hosted by Jimmy Kimmel, and the team took home the Emmy for Outstanding Variety Special (Live). In 2016 he starred in Fences alongside Viola Davis and Denzel Washington. In Fences he stars as Cory Maxson, the son of the main characters played by Davis and Washington. Adepo was "the only member of the Fences cast who did not star in the play's 2010 Broadway revival before it made the jump to feature film."

In 2017, he appeared as the central character along with Wyatt Russell in Overlord, both playing American paratroopers confronted by Nazi super soldiers. By 2017, he was also a series regular on The Leftovers on HBO, appearing in the second and third seasons. Adepo performed in the 2017 horror film Mother! by Darren Aronofsky.

In May 2019, he appeared as the adult Anton McCray in When They See Us, nominated for an Emmy, about the Central Park Five. In September 2019, he was cast as Larry Underwood in an upcoming version of Stephen King's The Stand. As of November 2019, he was in Vancouver shooting The Stand. In November 2019, he appeared as the central character in the sixth episode of Watchmen, playing the world's first superhero Hooded Justice. Also in November 2019, he was in an unreleased independent film called Violent Heart, to be released in 2020. He was named one of Dazed Magazine's "Dazed 100".

In March 2021, he was cast to star in Babylon.

Filmography

Film

Television

References

External links
 

Living people
1988 births
21st-century English male actors
African-American Christians
African-American male actors
American male television actors
American male film actors
American people of Nigerian descent
Black British male actors
Bowie State University alumni
Christians from Maryland
British emigrants to the United States
English male actors
English male television actors
English male film actors
English people of African-American descent
English people of Nigerian descent
Male actors from Oxfordshire
People from Cherwell District
People from Waldorf, Maryland
21st-century African-American people